Chullqi Mayu (Quechua chullqi wrinkle, mayu river, "wrinkle river", Hispanicized spelling Chullqui Mayu) is a Bolivian river in the Chuquisaca Department, Oropeza Province, Yotalla Municipalities. It is a left tributary of the Pillku Mayu.

See also

List of rivers of Bolivia

References

Chullqi Mayu